These are the partial results of the athletics competition at the 1975 Mediterranean Games taking place between 26 and 31 August 1975 in Algiers, Algeria.

Men's results

100 meters
Heats – 26 August

Final – 26 August

200 meters
Heats – 27 August

Final – 29 August

400 meters
Heats – 27 August

Final – 29 August

800 meters
Heats – 26 August

Final – 27 August

1500 meters
Heats – 29 August

Final – 30 August

5000 meters
30 August

10,000 meters
29 August

Marathon
31 August

110 meters hurdles
Heats – 26 August

Final – 27 August

400 meters hurdles
Heats – 27 August

Final – 29 August

3000 meters steeplechase
26 August

4 × 100 meters relay
31 August

4 × 400 meters relay
31 August

20 kilometers walk
26 August

High jump
27 August

Pole vault
30 August

Long jump
29 August

Triple jump
26 August

Shot put

Discus throw
28 August

Hammer throw
27 August

Javelin throw
30 August

Decathlon
29–30 August

Women's results

100 meters
Heats – 26 August

Final – 26 August

400 meters
29 August

800 meters
Heats – 26 August

Final – 27 August

1500 meters
29 August

100 meters hurdles
27 August

4 × 100 meters relay
30 August

High jump
26 August

Discus throw
29 August

References

Mediterranean Games
1975